Wassougna Souleymanou Hamidou (born 22 November 1973) is a Cameroonian former professional footballer who played as a goalkeeper.

International career
He was a member of the Cameroonian 2006 African Nations Cup team, who exited in the quarter-finals. He was again called up to the Cameroon squad for the 2010 FIFA World Cup, where he was starting goalkeeper for the three group matches played. This was considered a surprise, because he was selected by Paul Le Guen for this match over the expected keeper, Idriss Carlos Kameni. Cameroon lost all three of the group matches and thus did not qualify to move on to the knockout stage of the competition.

He was part of the victorious 2000 African Cup of Nations squad.

Honors
Cameroon
Africa Cup of Nations runner-up: 2008
Africa Cup of Nations: 2000

References

External links
 
 
 

Living people
1973 births
People from Far North Region (Cameroon)
Association football goalkeepers
Cameroonian Muslims
Cameroonian footballers
Cameroon international footballers
2000 African Cup of Nations players
2002 African Cup of Nations players
2006 Africa Cup of Nations players
2008 Africa Cup of Nations players
2010 Africa Cup of Nations players
2010 FIFA World Cup players
Süper Lig players
Coton Sport FC de Garoua players
Çaykur Rizespor footballers
Denizlispor footballers
Kayserispor footballers
Cameroonian expatriate footballers
Expatriate footballers in Turkey